Grant Deachman (May 4, 1913 – June 24, 1983) was a Canadian politician, who represented the electoral district of Vancouver Quadra in the House of Commons of Canada from 1963 to 1972.

He was a member of the Liberal Party and served as Chief Government Whip from 1971 to 1972.

Election results

Archives 
There is a Grant Deachman fonds at Library and Archives Canada. Archival reference number is R11992.

External links 
 

1913 births
1983 deaths
Liberal Party of Canada MPs
Members of the House of Commons of Canada from British Columbia
Politicians from Calgary
Politicians from Vancouver